Martin Wegelius (10 November 1846 – 22 March 1906) was a Finnish composer and musicologist, primarily remembered as the founder, in 1882, of the Helsinki Music Institute, now known as the Sibelius Academy.

Wegelius studied in Leipzig, Vienna and Munich. He had intended to pursue a career as a composer, and wrote handful of orchestral works and a significant number of chamber and vocal works. He was a particular admirer of Wagner but wrote predominantly in the Romantic style. After founding the Institute he had little time for composing, and appears to have concentrated exclusively on teaching. Graduate of Wegelius' Institute include Jean Sibelius and Agnes Tschetschulin.

He is often compared with his contemporary and rival Robert Kajanus, founder of the Helsinki Symphony Orchestra, the first professional symphony orchestra in the Nordic countries.

He is buried in the Hietaniemi Cemetery in Helsinki.

Notes

References
https://web.archive.org/web/20071202074336/http://www.fimic.fi/fimic/fimic.nsf/mainframe?readform&EAF0ABD4336C7AFDC2256D790037EAA7

Further reading

External links
 Martin Wegelius in 375 humanists – 6 May 2015. Faculty of Arts, University of Helsinki.

1846 births
1906 deaths
Finnish classical composers
Romantic composers
Finnish musicologists
Swedish-speaking Finns
Finnish male classical composers
Burials at Hietaniemi Cemetery
Finnish music educators
19th-century Finnish musicians
20th-century Finnish musicians
20th-century male musicians
19th-century male musicians
20th-century Finnish composers
19th-century musicologists